Fort San Antonio Abad, also known as Fort Malate or Fort San Antonio, is a fortification located in the Malate district of Manila, Philippines, completed in 1584 during the Spanish colonial period.

History 

Named in honour of its patron saint, Saint Anthony the Abbot, the structure was originally built in 1584 in what was then a separate hamlet of Malate to serve as a rear protection for the Manila as well as to guard the Manila–Cavite route.

They transformed the fort into a garrison from where the British forces launched their land offensive against the Spaniards defending Intramuros. The fort was returned to Spanish control upon the end of the British occupation of Manila in 1764 and again became a gunpowder storage facility.

The fort fell into American hands in 1898 during the Battle of Manila, and was seized by occupying Imperial Japanese troops during World War II, when it was used as a bunker.

The fort suffered considerable damage after the war, but was not restored until the 1970s. The restored fort is now enclosed within the confines of the Bangko Sentral ng Pilipinas (BSP) Complex between the Manila Metropolitan Museum and other buildings.

References

San Antonio Abad
Spanish colonial infrastructure in the Philippines
Buildings and structures in Malate, Manila
Cultural Properties of the Philippines in Metro Manila